The Stowe Open, also known in 1978 and 1979 by its sponsored name English Leather Grand Prix and from 1983 onward as the Head Classic, was a Grand Prix affiliated men's tennis tournament played from 1978 to 1983. It was held in Stowe, Vermont in the United States and played on outdoor hard courts. In 2017, it has been replaced by the Stowe Mountain Lodge Classic, an exhibition event which serves as a warm up event for the US Open which takes place every August 22nd–24th.

Past finals

Singles

Doubles

See also
 2007 Fed Cup World Group – semifinal played in Stowe

External links
 ATP results archive

Defunct tennis tournaments in the United States
Hard court tennis tournaments in the United States
Grand Prix tennis circuit